The Mahalingeshvara Temple at Santebachahalli

Santhebachahalli village (also spelt "Mahalingesvara"), is a 12th-century Hoysala era construction in the Mandya district of Karnataka state, India. According to noted art historian Adam Hardy, the temple architecture comprises a single vimana (etakuta, one shrine with a superstructure) with closed mantapa ("hall") and the building material is Soap stone. The monument is protected by the Karnataka state division of Archaeological Survey of India.

Notes

References
 Gerard Foekema, A Complete Guide to Hoysala Temples, Abhinav Publications, 1996, New Delhi, 
 Adam Hardy, Indian Temple Architecture: Form and Transformation : the Karṇāṭa Drāviḍa Tradition, 7th to 13th Centuries, Abhinav, 1995, New Delhi, .

Gallery

Hindu temples in Mandya district
Shiva temples in Karnataka